Catostemma is a genus of flowering plants belonging to the family Malvaceae.

Its native range is Southern Tropical America.

Species:

Catostemma albuquerquei 
Catostemma altsonii 
Catostemma cavalcantei 
Catostemma commune 
Catostemma digitata 
Catostemma durifolius 
Catostemma ebracteolatum 
Catostemma fragrans 
Catostemma grazielae 
Catostemma hirsutulum 
Catostemma lemense 
Catostemma marahuacense 
Catostemma milanezii 
Catostemma sancarlosianum 
Catostemma sclerophyllum

References

Malvaceae
Malvaceae genera